Charles Ayodeji Adeogun-Phillips (born 6 March 1966 in London, England) is a former United Nations genocide and war crimes prosecutor, international lawyer and founder of Charles Anthony (Lawyers) LLP.

Background
He is the son of Professor Anthony Adeyemi Adeogun, who was a Professor Emeritus of Commercial and Industrial Law and Deputy Vice-Chancellor, University of Lagos, and an international labour law expert. His mother, Margaret Amba Ayinke Adeogun (née Williams), is a retired nurse and midwife.

He is a grandson of Phillip Bamgbose and Theresa Fatola Adeogun of Ajale Compound Igbajo, Osun State, Federal Republic of Nigeria, and of Henry Isaac Kobina-Badu Williams, of Cape Coast, Republic of Ghana and Joanna Olasumbo Williams of Itesi, Abeokuta, Ogun State, Federal Republic of Nigeria. His name "Ayodeji" means "My joy is doubled" in Yoruba.

Education
He was educated at C.M.S. Grammar School, Lagos, Nigeria's first secondary school (founded in 1859) and at the prestigious British boarding school, Repton (founded in 1557). He read law at Warwick University from where he graduated in 1989 and at the School of Oriental and African Studies (SOAS), University of London, where he obtained his master's degree in law in 1994. He was admitted as a Barrister and Solicitor of the Supreme Court of Nigeria in 1992 and in 1996, as a Solicitor of the Superior Courts of England and Wales. In 2019, he was invited by his Alma Mata, Warwick University, to address the graduating class of that year.

Legal career

International legal career

Charles joined the Office of the Prosecutor (OTP) at the United Nations International Criminal Tribunal for Rwanda (UN-ICTR) as a legal adviser, from practice as a Solicitor in the United Kingdom, having been appointed by the then Chief Prosecutor of the UN-ICTY/UN-ICTR, Justice Louise Arbour (Judge of the Supreme Court of Canada and later UN High Commissioner for Human Rights) in January 1998.

In March 2001, at the age of 35, the then Chief Prosecutor of the UN-ICTY/UN-ICTR, Ms. Carla Del Ponte (former Attorney-General of Switzerland), appointed him as a senior trial attorney and lead prosecution counsel for the Kibuye and Kigali-Rural trial teams in the OTP. His mandate was to lead teams of international criminal lawyers and investigators in the prosecution of persons who bore the greatest responsibility for the massacres in the Kibuye, Bisesero and Bugesera regions – the main Tutsi strongholds during the 1994 Rwandan genocide. He also served as head of special investigations at the UN-ICTR between 2008 and 2009, having been appointed in that capacity by the then Chief Prosecutor of the UN-ICTR, Justice Hassan B. Jallow (Chief Justice of The Gambia).

For over a decade, between 2000 and 2010, Charles successfully led teams of international prosecutors and investigators in 12 precedent-setting and complex genocide and war crimes trials before the UN-ICTR, making him arguably one of the most experienced and successful genocide prosecutors in history.

With the Nuremberg and Tokyo’s war crimes trials in the 1940s serving as his only precedents, Charles’s work as a lead prosecutor, fighting for justice on behalf of over 800,000 victims of the worst crimes ever known to mankind, placed him in the forefront of several pioneering developments in the field of international humanitarian and criminal law, cumulating in his citation in the maiden edition of “Who’s Who in Public International Law” in 2007 and in the International Year Book and Statesmen's Who's Who in 2011.

The joint genocide trial which he led between 2001 and 2002 of Dr. Gerard Ntakirutimana and his father, Pastor Elizaphan Ntakirutimana– the leader of the Seventh Day Adventist Church who was transferred to the UN Court from the United States – was the subject of a book written by the American author, Philip Gourevitch, entitled We Wish to Inform You That Tomorrow We Will Be Killed with Our Families.

He also led the trial of serial rapist Mikaeli Muhimana, involving charges of sexual violence and cruelty against women, between 2004 and 2005. The Muhimana case clarified and developed the jurisprudence of the international criminal tribunals on the legal elements and definition of the crime of rape in the context of large scale and widespread international crimes.

Between 2006 and 2007, Charles led the high-profile genocide trial of Francois Karera, the former Governor of Kigali-Rural prefecture charged with directing and participating in the massacre of 5,000 (Five Thousand) Tutsi refugees gathered at the Ntarama Catholic Church on 15 April 1994 and of another 50,000 (Fifty Thousand) Tutsi civilians killed in the Nyamata area thereafter. The Ntarama church and the Nyamata massacre site have since become two of six genocide memorial sites in Rwanda.

Having led complex plea negotiations in the Vincent Rutaganira, Paul Bisengimana and Juvenal Rugambarara cases between 2004 and 2007 which resulted in guilty pleas to serious violations of international humanitarian law, Adeogun-Phillips is one of the few international prosecutors in the world who have contributed to the development and practice of guilty plea negotiations in the context of large-scale international crimes.

Charles also led a team of international prosecutors in the retrial of Lt. Col Tharcisse Muvunyi, between 17 June and 2 October 2009, on the charges of direct and public incitement to commit genocide. He had led the original trial in the case between 28 February 2005 and 23 June 2006 following which the defendant was convicted. However, on 29 August 2008, the Appeals Chamber reversed all the convictions against the defendant and ordered a retrial on the charge of direct and public incitement to commit genocide. The retrial in the Muvunyi case in 2009 was the first of its kind before any of the international criminal tribunals.

Other notable international genocide trials he led include that of the former Deputy-Governor, Dominique Ntawukulilyayo, in 2009 and that of the former Finance Minister, Emmanuel Ndindabahizi between 2003 and 2004. He was also prosecution counsel on the Ignace Bagilishema and Alfred Musema trials between 1999 and 2000.

As an international prosecutor, Charles prevailed in trials against some of the world's most reputed criminal defence lawyers including Ramsey Clarke-–the 66th Attorney-General of the United States (1967–69) and lawyer to controversial figures such as Slobodan Milošević, Radovan Karadžić and Saddam Hussein; Edward Medvene-–who represented Fred Goldman in the civil action against O. J. Simpson over the killing of his son, Ron Goldman; French lawyer, François Roux; and Steven Kay, QC, the court-appointed lawyer for former Serbian President Slobodan Milošević.

His work on behalf of the survivors and victims of the Rwandan genocide has been the subject of several books including Court of Remorse by Thierry Cruvellier (Wisconsin Press 2010); Guilty Pleas in International Criminal Law by Nancy Combs and Annotated Leading Cases of International Criminal Tribunals by André Klip and Goran Sluiter (Intersentia 2005).  He also appears in the UN documentary, Towards Reconciliation.

Together with other leading international criminal law practitioners, Charles contributed to the book: International Criminal Investigations: Law and Practice, published by Eleven at the Hague in 2017. He has also published several articles in the areas of international criminal law, victim compensation and the "complementarity principle" in the Rome Statute of the ICC. He has been invited as a guest speaker on several national and international TV programmes and at several prestigious educational institutions worldwide on various aspects of investigating and prosecuting international crimes, international law, corruption, tracing and/or repatriating stolen assets, victim compensation and/or reparations. He has also served as a visiting lecturer on international humanitarian law at the National Defence College, Nigeria and at the Nigerian Institute of Advanced Legal Studies.

Regional and domestic legal career
In June 2010, following his distinguished UN career, Charles returned to private practice and founded Charles Anthony (Lawyers) LLP, a cross-border firm of legal practitioners in Lagos and London, with specialisation in international criminal and human rights law, complex white-collar crime, and international asset recovery matters. He is currently admitted to practice as list counsel before several international and regional courts including the International Criminal Court (ICC), the Special Tribunal for Lebanon (STL), the United Nations Residual Mechanism for International Tribunals (UNMIT) and the African Court on Human and People’s Rights in Tanzania (AfCHPR). Since 2018, he has served as the International Criminal Court Bar Association’s focal point for Nigeria.

In 2013, while representing the outspoken Tanzanian opposition politician, the late Rev Christopher Mtikila, in a landmark and precedent-setting case against the United Republic of Tanzania before the African Court on Human and Peoples’ Rights, he successfully challenged the Tanzanian constitutional prohibition against independent candidature for election into public office as a violation of the African Charter on Human and People’s Rights. The Mtikila vs. Tanzania case was the first case to be heard by the said Court on its merits since its inception in 2004.  It was also the first case to be decided by the Court in favour of the Applicant and the first case before the Court on the issue of reparations.

His advisory practice in international criminal and humanitarian law has included providing specialist advice to the Military High Command in Nigeria in connection with the preliminary examinations launched by the ICC into alleged crimes against humanity and/or war crimes committed in the context of armed conflict between “Boko Haram” and the Nigerian security forces. He also advises various African governments on ICC related transitional justice issues.

He has acted on matters involving corruption, asset forfeiture, money laundering and fraud (including tracing the proceeds of fraud), international recognition of anti-money laundering protocols and jurisdictional issues.

In 2016, Charles was appointed by the Attorney-General of the Federal Republic of Nigeria to lead the unprecedented corruption trials of senior judicial officers, including a serving Judge of the Supreme Court of Nigeria, the late Honourable Justice Sylvester Ngwuta, JSC.

Since 2017, Charles has been retained by the Asset Management Corporation of Nigeria to investigate, trace and recover over 5 trillion Naira (14 billion US Dollars) currently owed to the Nigerian Government, following its acquisition in 2011, of non-performing loans from some of the country’s ailing commercial banks.

References

External link

1966 births
Living people
Black British lawyers
Alumni of SOAS University of London
Alumni of the University of Warwick
20th-century Nigerian lawyers
English people of Nigerian descent
CMS Grammar School, Lagos alumni
21st-century Nigerian lawyers